Omaha station is an Amtrak intercity train station in Omaha, Nebraska, United States. It is served daily by the California Zephyr. The station was built by Amtrak in 1983 as a replacement for the directly adjacent Chicago, Burlington and Quincy Railroad Station that was opened in 1898, and has been listed on the National Register of Historic Places since 1974. The structure utilizes the Type 50C specification of Amtrak's standard design.

Omaha station is not directly served by local public transit provider Metro Transit. The closest bus stop is located 4 blocks away at the intersection of South 13th Street and Pacific Street. This stop is served by Route 13, however, the service span does not include the times when the California Zephyr is scheduled to arrive and depart.

See also
Omaha Union Station
Omaha Burlington Station

References

External links

Omaha Amtrak Station (USA RailGuide -- TrainWeb)

Amtrak stations in Nebraska
Railway stations in Omaha, Nebraska
Railway stations in the United States opened in 1983